Under Wheels of Confusion is a 1996 compilation album from heavy metal legends Black Sabbath. The album covers the years 1970-1987 (specifically, every album from Black Sabbath to The Eternal Idol). It is a four-disc set.

Track listing
Disc One
 "Black Sabbath"
 "The Wizard"
 "N.I.B."
 "Evil Woman"
 "Wicked World"
 "War Pigs"
 "Paranoid"
 "Iron Man"
 "Planet Caravan"
 "Hand of Doom"
 "Sweet Leaf"
 "After Forever"
 "Children of the Grave"
Disc Two
 "Into the Void"
 "Lord of This World"
 "Orchid"
 "Supernaut"
 "Tomorrow's Dream"
 "Wheels of Confusion"
 "Changes"
 "Snowblind"
 "Laguna Sunrise"
 "Cornucopia" (live from Live at Last)
 "Sabbath Bloody Sabbath"
 "Killing Yourself To Live"
 "Hole in the Sky"
 "Am I Going Insane (Radio)"
Disc Three
 "The Writ"
 "Symptom of the Universe"
 "Dirty Women"
 "Back Street Kids"
 "Rock 'N' Roll Doctor"
 "She's Gone"
 "A Hard Road"
 "Never Say Die"
 "Neon Knights"
 "Heaven and Hell"
 "Die Young"
 "Lonely is the Word"
Disc Four
 "Turn Up the Night"
 "The Sign of the Southern Cross"
 "Falling Off the Edge of the World"
 "The Mob Rules" (live from Live Evil)
 "Voodoo" (live from Live Evil)
 "Digital Bitch"
 "Trashed"
 "Hot Line"
 "In for the Kill"
 "Seventh Star"
 "Heart Like a Wheel"
 "The Shining"
 "Eternal Idol"

See also

1996 compilation albums
Black Sabbath compilation albums